Nissen Nemanov (1904–1984), known familiarly as Reb Nissen, was a Belarusian Orthodox rabbi. He served as a Mashpia, Hasidic mentor, in the Yeshiva of Tomchei Temimim in Brunoy, near Paris, France. He taught many thousands of students during his lifetime, and was renowned for his piety and abstinence. He was buried in the Mount of Olives in Jerusalem.

Life 

Nemanov was born in Zhlobin on 13 Av, 1904 to Yitzchak and Shaina Chaya Nemanov. He left home and went to study at the tender age of 12 in the Yeshiva of the fifth Lubavitcher Rebbe, Sholom Dov Ber Schneersohn (the Rebbe Rashab). The sixth Lubavitcher Rebbe, Yosef Yitzchok Schneersohn (the Rebbe Rayatz) appointed him the rosh yeshiva and mashpia in various yeshivos in cities of Russia, and he was appointed at the head of struggles against the Soviet regime, who incarcerated him several times and tortured him for spreading Torah and delivering classes in chassidus. In 1947 he reached Paris and established a large yeshiva in Brunoy.

Refinement of character 
He would pray at great length according to the custom of Chabad. In Nemanov's thirties, the Rayatz testified that Nemanov had reached the level of beinoni discussed in Tanya, one whose every thought, speech, and action is consistent with the Code of Jewish Law. Rabbi Menachem Mendel Schneerson sent many of his followers to Nemanov to receive guidance in their divine service; the communication link and flow of suggestions was both ways.

A student, 40 year later, still follows the idea of not eating "primarily to appeal to a person's desire" - whether it's ice cream or "a superfluous second helping."

Distinguished colleagues 
When rabbi Yisrael Abuchatzeira (also known as the Baba Sali) lived in France, he would spend the month of Elul as Nemanov's guest.

Family 
Nemanov had four children: Rochel Pewzner, Sholom DovBer Nemanov, Moshe Nemanov, and Yitzchak "Itche" Nemanov.

References

Sources
 HaPardes, June 1984, vol. 58, no. 9, pp. 30–31.
  Communicating the infinite: the emergence of Habad school, Naftali Loewenthal, pg. 298

External links 
 Burial info in Mount of Olives database, photo of tombstone - (Hebrew)

Chabad-Lubavitch Mashpiim
Hasidic rabbis in Europe
1904 births
1984 deaths
Belarusian Hasidic rabbis
French Orthodox rabbis
20th-century French rabbis